The Plesiosauridae are a monophyletic group of plesiosaurs.

A family Plesiosauridae was first named by John Edward Gray in 1825.

References

Plesiosaurs
Jurassic plesiosaurs
Hettangian first appearances
Late Jurassic extinctions
Taxa named by John Edward Gray

it:Plesiosauridae